László Vizler (born 13 October 2002) is a Hungarian football midfielder who plays for Puskás Akadémia II.

Career statistics
.

References

External links
 
 

2001 births
People from Győr
21st-century Hungarian people
Living people
Hungarian footballers
Association football midfielders
Puskás Akadémia FC players
Puskás Akadémia FC II players
FC Ajka players
Nemzeti Bajnokság I players
Nemzeti Bajnokság II players
Nemzeti Bajnokság III players